WNNC (1230 AM) is a commercial radio station broadcasting an oldies music format and licensed to serve the community of Newton, North Carolina, part of the Hickory-Newton-Conover metro area. The station is owned by Newton-Conover Communications, Inc and broadcasts in C-QUAM AM stereo.

Translator
WNNC programming is simulcast on the following translator:

References

External links

NNC
Oldies radio stations in the United States
Radio stations established in 1948